The 2021 Little League World Series was held from August 19 to August 29 at the Little League headquarters complex in South Williamsport, Pennsylvania. Due to the COVID-19 pandemic, the event was limited to US-based teams only. The most recent prior edition of the tournament contested without international teams had been 1975. Taylor North Little League of Taylor, Michigan, defeated West Side Little League of Hamilton, Ohio, in the championship by a 5–2 score. It was the first championship for a team from Michigan since .

On August 13, it was announced that tickets would not be distributed to the public due to concerns over the Delta variant, with spectators limited to invited friends and family of teams, and other high-level supporters.

Teams

The 16-team field consisted of the top two teams from eight regional tournaments, contested during July and August.

The eight teams appearing on a grey background were placed in the Tom Seaver championship bracket, while the other eight teams were placed in the Hank Aaron championship bracket.

Ella Bruning of the team from Abilene, Texas, became one of the few girls who have competed in the Little League World Series.

Results 

The draw to determine the opening round pairings took place on June 18, 2021.

Hank Aaron championship

Tom Seaver championship

Consolation game

World Championship
The championship game was a rematch of the Great Lakes regional final during the qualification stage, which was won by Michigan, 9–1.

Champions path
The Taylor North LL reached the LLWS with an undefeated record in seven games. In total, their record was 16–1, with their only loss coming to Hawaii in the third round of double-elimination play in South Williamsport.

2021 MLB Little League Classic 
The MLB Little League Classic game at Muncy Bank Ballpark at Historic Bowman Field in nearby Williamsport, Pennsylvania, was played on August 22 between the Cleveland Indians and Los Angeles Angels. Cleveland won the game, 3–0. The fourth edition of the Classic to be played, it became the first edition contested between American League teams, after the 2020 game scheduled between the Boston Red Sox and Baltimore Orioles was cancelled due to the COVID-19 pandemic.

References

External links
 2021 LLBWS Tournament Bracket at littleleague.org

2021
Little League World Series
Little League World Series
Little League World Series